The Peugeot 107 is a city car produced by French automaker Peugeot, launched in June 2005, and produced until 2014.

The 107 was developed by the B-Zero project of PSA Peugeot Citroën in a joint venture with Toyota; the Citroën C1 and Toyota Aygo are badge engineered variants of each other, the Aygo having more detail differences from the C1 and 107. The three were manufactured at the TPCA assembly joint venture in Kolín, Czech Republic.

The 107 is a four-seater available as a three or five-door hatchback, replacing the 106, which ended production in July 2003. It shares its rear tail light clusters with the Citroën C1, apart from a different red coloured lens.

Engines

Facelifts 

In February 2009, the Peugeot 107 received a facelift aligned with revisions to the Citroën C1 and the Toyota Aygo. Aesthetic changes included revised front bumper, interior, and wheel trims. The front fascia received a wider grill. 

The placement of the number plate has been moved from the black stripe in the middle of the grill (which now has a chrome style strip running along with it) to underneath the grill itself and two side vents have been added to give the car an updated look. The interior offered more seat fabric choices and revised centre console graphics.

In the beginning of 2012, the 107 received a further facelift with a revised bonnet and front bumper/grille with integrated daytime running lights. The interior received a leather steering wheel and a new gearshift on higher-level trims. The official premiere of the facelift was in the Brussels Motor Show.

Reliability 
Breakdown statistics reported by the German Automobile Club in May 2010 placed the Peugeot 107 (which the data grouped with the Citroën C1 and Toyota Aygo) at the top of the sub small car class, in respect of the low breakdown rates achieved for cars aged between 1 and 4 years. Class laggards were the Chevrolet Matiz (0–3 year old cars) and the two seater Smart (4–5 year old cars).

In January 2010, PSA announced that it was recalling "under 100,000 units" of the 107 and the Citroën C1, following the worldwide recall by Toyota for a faulty sticking accelerator pedal – which the Aygo is affected by. Under certain circumstances, the pedal can stick in a partially depressed position, or return slowly to the off position.

Safety

Replacement 
The 107 was replaced by the Peugeot 108, which was launched in July 2014.

Sales

References

External links 

 

107
City cars
Front-wheel-drive vehicles
Hatchbacks
Euro NCAP superminis
2010s cars
Cars introduced in 2005
Cars of the Czech Republic